Tip Top is an ice cream brand founded in 1936 in Wellington, New Zealand and now owned by Froneri (a joint venture between PAI Partners and Nestlé). It was formerly known as Fonterra Brands (Tip Top) Ltd, a subsidiary of the Fonterra Co-operative Group based in Auckland, New Zealand.

History

In 1936 Albert Hayman and Len Malaghan opened their first ice cream parlour in Manners Street, Wellington, followed in the same year by two more milk bars, one in Wellington and one in Dunedin. The Tip Top Ice Cream Company was registered as a manufacturing company in 1936.
By 1938 Tip Top was manufacturing its own ice cream and was successfully operating stores in the lower half of the North Island, and in Nelson and Blenheim.

In May 1938 Tip Top Ice Cream Company Auckland Limited was incorporated into the growing ice cream business. Due to distribution difficulties and World War II, this was operated as a completely separate company to the Wellington Tip Top.

In November 1962, Hayman and Malaghan opened the biggest and most technically advanced ice cream factory in the Southern Hemisphere, built at Mount Wellington, Auckland, New Zealand. Prime Minister Keith Holyoake attended the opening ceremony.

By 1960 the Company had expanded to such an extent that a parent company was formed, General Foods Corporation (NZ) Limited.
The Auckland Tip Top factory was originally a seasonal factory, which worked only to produce ice cream for the summer months. They sold for a shilling, and early innovations led to ice cream inventions like Topsy, Jelly Tip, FruJu and Ice Cream Sundaes. The commercial success of these products transformed the Mt Wellington site into a 24-hour, year-round operation.

As demand grew over the years, 2 further plants were opened in Christchurch and Perth. In the year 1991 the Christchurch factory was specially designed to meet the stringent export requirements of the Japanese market.

In 1985 New Zealand supermodel Rachel Hunter appeared for the first time on television in an advertisement for Tip Top Trumpet in the year 1985, which also helped to launch her career.

In April 1997 Heinz Watties sold Tip Top to a Western Australian food processor, Peters & Browne's Foods. This merger of Peters & Browne's and Tip Top created the largest independent ice cream business in the Southern Hemisphere with combined sales of $550 million.
Four years later in June 2001, New Zealand's national dairy co-operative Fonterra bought Tip Top Ice Cream after purchasing the Peter and Browne's Foods Business.
In 2007 the Christchurch Factory was closed with all production moving to Auckland.

In 2019 Fonterra sold Tip Top for $380 million to UK-based company Froneri, a joint venture owned by Nestlé and PAI Partners, citing a conflict of interest between Fonterra being a dairy nutrition company and Tip Top being a confectionery business.

In October 2022, Tip Top discontinued two flavours of ice cream including the Cookies & Cream flavour that had just won a national award in the previous month, to considerable public outcry in New Zealand.

Operation

At the time of the 2019 sale to Froneri, Tip Top produced around 41 million litres of ice cream a year. Tip Top Ice Cream is exported to Australia, Japan, Taiwan, Malaysia, Indonesia and the Pacific Islands.

List of Tip Top brands

Pre 1950s
 Tip Top Ice cream available in quarts (1 litre approx) and pints (600ml approx)
 Eskimo Pie (Tip Top's first novelty product)
 Topsy (first stick icecream produced by Tip Top)named after a cow

1950s

 Jelly Tip
 Rocky Road
 Toppa
 TT2's
 Joy Bars

1960s
 Trumpet
 Fruju 
 Moggy man
 Tip Top Ice cream available in plastic 2 litre container

1970s
 Popsicle
 R2D2 Iceblock
 Choc Bar

1980s

 Crofters Cheesecakes
 Goody Goody Gumdrops
 Batman
 Hokey Bar (with heart of gold)

1990s

 Memphis Meltdown
 Teenage Mutant Ninja Turtles (in a 2-litre bowl with the ice cream resembling one of the turtles)
 Moritz
 Cadbury Ice Cream range (in 2 litre bowls and novelty cones)
 Sonic the Hedgehog Milk Ice
 Paradiso
 Jelly Tip in two litre tub

2000s

 Popsicle Creamy (previously Chill)
 Screwball
 Soft Serve
 Plus many more flavour additions and variations on historically produced Ice Creams.
 Popsicle Milky
 Popsicle Fruity
 Popsicle Slushy
 Ronald McDonald ice cream
 Cone Ball
 Choc bar
 Fruju - Pineapple
 Jelly Tip

References

External links
Tip Top official website

Food manufacturers of New Zealand
Dairy products companies of New Zealand
Froneri
Ice cream brands